The 1941 South Dakota State Jackrabbits football team was an American football team that represented South Dakota State University in the North Central Conference during the 1941 college football season. In its first season under head coach Thurlo McCrady, the team compiled a 2–5 record and was outscored by a total of 131 to 32.

Guard Leon Anderson was the team captain. He was also selected by the college sports editors to the 1941 All-North Central Conference football team.

Schedule

References

South Dakota State
South Dakota State Jackrabbits football seasons
South Dakota State Jackrabbits football